Pilot snake may refer to:

 Pantherophis alleghaniensis, pilot snake or pilot black snake
 Pituophis melanoleucus, or pilot snake
 Pantherophis bairdi, Baird's pilot snake
 Pantherophis emoryi, Emory's pilot snake
Pantherophis obsoletus, pilot black snake